Geisinger Commonwealth School of Medicine (GCSOM) is a private medical school associated with the Geisinger Health System in northeastern and north central Pennsylvania. GCSOM offers a community-based model of medical education with six regional campuses - North (Scranton, PA), South (Wilkes-Barre, PA), Central (Danville, PA), West (Lewistown, PA), Atlanticare (Atlantic City, NJ), and Guthrie (Sayre, PA). It offers a Doctor of Medicine (MD) Program and a Master of Biomedical Sciences (MBS) Program.

History 
The foundation of GCSOM, formerly known as The Commonwealth Medical College (TCMC), began with the establishment of the Northeastern Pennsylvania Medical Education Development Consortium (MEDC) in 2004. The consortium included business, medical, community, and government representatives. After acquiring funding from the Commonwealth of Pennsylvania, Blue Cross of Northeastern Pennsylvania, and other state, federal and private philanthropic sources, the Commonwealth Medical Education Corporation was formed. In the spring of 2007, Robert M. D’Alessandri began his tenure as president and founding dean.

Commonwealth was awarded degree-granting authority by the Commonwealth of Pennsylvania in 2008 and received preliminary accreditation by the Liaison Committee on Medical Education (LCME) in 2008. D'Alessandri resigned from his position as dean and president in April 2011. In June 2011, the LCME placed GCSOM on probation due to financial stability concerns. Provisional accreditation was granted in 2012, with full accreditation granted in June 2014. In June 2014, GCSOM was also granted full accreditation by the Middle States Commission on Higher Education (MSCHE). GCSOM accepted its first class of medical and master's students in 2009. GCSOM graduated its first MD and fourth MBS classes in May 2013.

On September 28, 2016, Geisinger Health System announced it had acquired the Commonwealth Medical College. The acquisition integrated aspects of the health system, such as residency training programs, into TCMC, and also introduced new Master's programs. Additionally, TCMC was renamed Geisinger Commonwealth School of Medicine.

On September 2021, Geisinger announced that Julie Byerley, M.D., M.P.H., will serve as the new president and dean of the Geisinger Commonwealth School of Medicine, executive vice president and chief academic officer, effective January 1, 2022. She succeeds Steven Scheinman, M.D., who has served as the president and dean of the School of Medicine since 2012.

Admissions and academics
Entry into the Geisinger Commonwealth School of Medicine is competitive, with 5,992 applications received for a class size of 111 in 2022. The MD Class of 2026 had an average MCAT score of 511.62 and GPA of 3.75 on admission. 12% of the class is from groups historically underrepresented in medicine, and 71% of the 108 students that comprise the class are from Pennsylvania. 29% of the class is specifically from Northeastern Pennsylvania and North Central Pennsylvania.

In 2021, the school launched the Total Health Curriculum, designed to align the medical school program with the Geisinger Health System.  Graduates complete objectives in 6 major categories (patients, families and communities, professional identity, health system science, critical thinking, clinical skills, and knowledge for practice).  The Total Health Curriculum is unique in that it includes 6 longitudinal themes (Social Justice and Health Equity, Health System Citizenship, Primary Care, Personal and Professional Development, Community Immersion and Population Health), intended to prepare graduates for 21st century practice.

References

External links 

Geisinger Commonwealth School of Medicine
Universities and colleges in Lackawanna County, Pennsylvania
2008 establishments in Pennsylvania
Educational institutions established in 2008